Mohamed Ramadan may refer to:
 Mohamed Ramadan (fencer) (born 1931), Lebanese fencer
 Mohamed Ramadan (boxer) (born 1986), Egyptian boxer
 Mohamed Ramadan (footballer, born 1970), Egyptian footballer
 Mohamed Ramadan (footballer, born 1991), Swedish footballer of Lebanese descent
 Mohamed Ibrahim Ramadan (born 1984), Egyptian handballer
 Mohamed Ramadan (actor and singer) (born 1988), Egyptian actor
 Muhammad Said Ramadan al-Bouti (1929–2013), Syrian Muslim scholar
 Mohamed Ahmed Ramadan (born 1995), Egyptian karateka